The History of Howard Stern is a radio documentary series about the life and career of American radio personality Howard Stern, covering the years from his childhood through 2001. It originally aired across 35 episodes in four "acts" on Howard 100 on SiriusXM Radio between December 17, 2007 and December 31, 2010. Each episode includes segments from The Howard Stern Show, interviews with the show's staff, celebrity guests, and his family, and excerpts of news reports. The series is narrated by Jim Forbes. 

In 2008, the series won a Communicator Award. Act III was given a Silver World Medal award at the 2010 International Radio Programming and Promotion Awards in the History category. An additional episode covering the show's final two years on terrestrial radio in 2004 and 2005 aired in July 2015.

Background
On June 7, 2006, Stern announced on his show that the lawsuit settlement with CBS Radio (formerly Infinity Broadcasting) finally gave Sirius exclusive rights to his entire back catalogue of radio shows from his time at terrestrial radio station WXRK, which spanned over twenty years from November 1985 to December 2005, totalling almost 23,000 hours. It was reported that Sirius agreed to pay CBS $2 million for the rights, approximately $87 per-hour of tape. Sirius held the rights to the tapes until the end of Stern's initial 5-year contract with the satellite company on December 31, 2010, when all rights returned to Stern. On December 2, 2009, it was announced that every tape had been digitized on a server taking up multiple terabytes of data. The process took close to five years to complete. This has allowed all specials broadcast on Howard 100 and Howard 101 to be produced.

Personnel

Production ("The Tapes Team")
David Heydt – executive producer
Jeremy Lipkin – producer, writer
Rich Gibbons – producer
Paul Grassini – producer
David LeClaire – segment producer
Ben Barto – assistant producer
Ryan Rasmason – assistant editor
Adam Frederick - intern

The Howard Stern Show staff
Howard Stern
Robin Quivers
Fred Norris
Gary Dell'Abate
Jackie Martling
Artie Lange
See more

Others
Jim Forbes – narrator

Episodes

Act I

Act II

Act III

Act IV

Additional material
An episode covering 2004 and 2005 aired on July 17, 2015 which included the departure of John Melendez, the early period of JD Harmeyer, the show's run-ins with the FCC, and Stern's departure from terrestrial radio for Sirius. The episode was narrated by AJ Allen.

References

External links
The Howard Stern Show at HowardStern.com
The Howard Stern Show at Sirius XM

Sirius Satellite Radio
2007 radio programme debuts
2010 radio programme endings
Howard Stern